Cloete-Joubert Hospital is a Provincial government funded hospital for the Senqu Local Municipality area in Barkly East in the Eastern Cape of South Africa. It forms a cluster with Empilisweni, Lady Grey and Umlamli Hospitals.

The hospital departments include Emergency department, Maternity ward, Out Patients Department, Surgical Services, Medical Services, Pediatric ward, Pharmacy, Anti-Retroviral (ARV) treatment for HIV/AIDS, Oral Health Care Provides, Physiotherapy, Laundry Services, Kitchen Services and Mortuary.

History 

The Cloete-Joubert hospital in Barkly East is a monument for Mr. Piet Joubert by his wife who was a Cloete and daughter of one of the wealthiest cattle farmers in South Africa, CWP Cloete of Glen Almond. The Joubert couple had no children, and after her death she intended to donate her money to a hospital. But Mr. Greyvenstein, who was her lawyer, persuaded her to keep the Cloete money in the area. As such, a small hospital was planned. The total cost of the hospital was £100 000 of which £80 000 came from the Joubert couple. The hospital was opened by Prime Minister Swart and by Dollie Cloete (the granddaughter of CWP Cloete by his first wife).

References
 Eastern Cape Department of Health website - Joe Gqabi District Hospitals

Hospitals in the Eastern Cape
Joe Gqabi District Municipality